The Blue Ribbon Award for Best Newcomer is a prize recognizing an outstanding performance by a newcomer in a Japanese film. It is awarded annually by the Association of Tokyo Film Journalists as one of the Blue Ribbon Awards.

List of winners

References

External links
Blue Ribbon Awards on IMDb

Awards established in 1950
Recurring events established in 1950
1950 establishments in Japan
N